Uğur Güneş (born August 11, 1993 in Karamürsel, Kocaeli) is a Turkish volleyball player. He is 204 cm and plays as middle blocker. He has been playing for Fenerbahçe Grundig  since 2007 and wears the number 11.

Honours and awards
 2007-08 Turkish Cup Champion with Fenerbahçe SK
 2007-08 Turkish Men's Volleyball League Champion with Fenerbahçe SK
 2008-09 Turkish Men's Volleyball League runner-up with Fenerbahçe SK
 2008-09 CEV Champions League Top 16 with Fenerbahçe SK
 2009-10 Balkan Cup Champion with Fenerbahçe SK
 2009-10 Turkish Men's Volleyball League Champion with Fenerbahçe SK
 2010-11 Turkish Volleyball Super Cup runner-up with Fenerbahçe
 2010-11 Turkish Volleyball Cup runner-up with Fenerbahçe
 2010-11 Turkish Men's Volleyball League Champion with Fenerbahçe SK
 2011-12 Turkish Men's Volleyball League Champion with Fenerbahçe
 2011-12 Turkish Volleyball Cup Champion with Fenerbahçe
 2011-12 Turkish Volleyball Super Cup Champion with Fenerbahçe
 2012-13 Turkish Volleyball Super Cup Champion with Fenerbahçe
 2013-14 Balkan Cup Champion with Fenerbahçe SK
 2013-14 Turkish Volleyball Cup runner-up with Fenerbahçe
 2013-14 Turkish Men's Volleyball League runner-up with Fenerbahçe SK
 2013-14 CEV Challenge Cup Champion with Fenerbahçe
 2014-15 Turkish Volleyball Super Cup runner-up with Fenerbahçe

External links 
 Player profile at fenerbahce.org

References

1993 births
Living people
Turkish men's volleyball players
Fenerbahçe volleyballers
21st-century Turkish people